Alia or Aleah is both a surname and a feminine given name which are both variations of the name Aaliyah. In the Hebrew world, the name means “high” or “exalted”. The name is also common in the Christian and Muslim world. The name is prominent in Europe in countries such as Italy, Spain, France and Poland. Notable examples with the name include:Alias (TV series)

Surname
Gjergj Elez Alia, a legendary hero of poetry and literature in Bosnia and Albania
Giuseppe Alia, murderer of Father Leo Heinrichs (1867–1908)
Malek Aït Alia (born 1977), Algerian footballer
Ramiz Alia (1925–2011), second and last Communist leader of Albania (1985–1991) and head of state (1982–1992)

Given name

Alia
Alia Atkinson (born 1988), former competitive swimmer and five-time Olympian
Alia Bano, British playwright of Pashtun origin
Alia Bhatt (born 1993), British actress
Alia Ghanem, birth name of Hamida al-Attas (born 1934), mother of Osama bin Laden
Alia al-Hussein (1948–1977), Queen of Jordan
Princess Alia bint Al Hussein (born 1956), eldest child of King Hussein of Jordan
Alia Mamdouh (born 1944), Iraqi novelist, author and journalist
Alia Ouabdelsselam (born 1978), French retired ice dancer
Alia Penner (born 1985/1986), American pop artist
Alia Humaid Al Qassimi, Emirati surgeon
Alia Sabur (born 1989), American materials scientist and world's youngest professor
Alia Shawkat (born 1989), American actress
Princess Alia Tabba (born 1964), Jordanian princess

Aleah
Aleah Chapin (born 1986), American painter
Aleah Stanbridge (1976–2016), South African singer-songwriter, former singer of death/doom metal band Trees of Eternity.

Fictional characters
Alia Atreides in the Dune universe created by Frank Herbert
Alia in the Mega Man X video game series

See also
Alija — a surname and a given name
Aliya — an Arabic given name that is the feminine form of Ali, meaning "high" and "exalted" (also spelled Aaliyah or Alia)

Feminine given names